Gertrude Mbeyu Mwanyanje is a Kenyan politician who is currently a member of the Kenya National Assembly as the woman representative for Kilifi. She is a member of the Orange Democratic Movement.

References

Year of birth missing (living people)
Living people
Orange Democratic Movement politicians
Place of birth missing (living people)
Kenyan women representatives
21st-century Kenyan women politicians